Adtala is a village in Lathi Taluka of Amreli district, Gujarat, India. It is about eight miles west of Lathi.

History
The village was under Jetpur State during British period.

Notable people 

 Pan Nalin, film director

References

Cities and towns in Amreli district